Ostrinia zaguliaevi is a moth in the family Crambidae. It was described by Akira Mutuura and Eugene G. Munroe in 1970. It is found in the Russian Far East, Japan and China.

Subspecies
Ostrinia zaguliaevi zaguliaevi (Russia: Amur)
Ostrinia zaguliaevi honshuensis Mutuura & Munroe, 1970 (Japan: Honshu)
Ostrinia zaguliaevi kyushuensis Mutuura & Munroe, 1970 (Japan: Kyushu)
Ostrinia zaguliaevi ryukyuensis Mutuura & Munroe, 1970 (Japan: Ryukyus)
Ostrinia zaguliaevi tienmuensis Mutuura & Munroe, 1970 (China: Chekiang)

References

Moths described in 1970
Pyraustinae